Scleroderma-like reaction to taxanes may occur in patients treated with docetaxel or paclitaxel, characterized by an acute, diffuse, infiltrated edema of the extremities and head.

See also
Skin lesion

References

External links 

 

Drug eruptions